Eastside Junior-Senior High School is a public secondary school located in Butler, Indiana.  The school serves students in grades 7 to 12 for the DeKalb County Eastern Community School District.

Athletics 
Eastside is in the Northeast Corner Conference, and is a 2A school. The teams are called the Blazers and the school colors are kelly green and white.  The following IHSAA sports are offered at Eastside:

Baseball (boys)
Basketball (boys and girls)
Cross Country (boys and girls)
Football (boys)
Golf (boys)
Soccer (boys)
Softball (girls)
State champions - 1998
State champions - 2022
Wrestling (boys)
Volleyball (girls)

Extracurricular activities 
The school also sponsors the following clubs: Spanish, Dekalb voice, amnesty international, junior high art, science and speech clubs.  The school is also the sponsor of various musical groups such as: Marching Band, Jazz Band, Pep Band, Jazz Choir, Junior High Show Choir.

Demographics
The demographic breakdown of the 625 students enrolled for 2013-14 was:
Male - 52.6%
Female - 47.4%
Native American/Alaskan - 0.3%
Asian/Pacific islanders - 1.0%
Black - 1.0%
Hispanic - 3.5%
White - 93.1%
Multiracial - 1.1%

42.4% of the students were eligible for free or reduced lunch.

See also
 List of high schools in Indiana

References

External links 

School district website

Educational institutions established in 1963
Public high schools in Indiana
Schools in DeKalb County, Indiana
Public middle schools in Indiana
1963 establishments in Indiana